Death-associated protein kinase 1 is an enzyme that in humans is encoded by the DAPK1 gene.

Function 

Death-associated protein kinase 1 is a positive mediator of gamma-interferon induced programmed cell death.  DAPK1 encodes a structurally unique 160-kD calmodulin dependent serine-threonine kinase that carries 8 ankyrin repeats and 2 putative P-loop consensus sites. It is a tumor suppressor candidate.

In melanocytic cells DAPK1 gene expression may be regulated by MITF.

As a drug target 

Depletion of DAPK1 results in inhibition of tumor cell count and volume growth in cellular and animal models of triple receptor-negative breast cancer, from individuals with p53-mutant cancers. This has not been demonstrated in actual patients.

References

Further reading 

 
 
 
 
 
 
 
 
 
 
 
 
 
 
 
 
 
 

EC 2.7.11